I Could Be So Good for You may refer to:

 "I Could Be So Good for You", the theme tune to the TV series Minder
 "I Could Be So Good for You", a song on the Kenny Rogers album Love or Something Like It